Boris, Prince of Tarnovo, Duke in Saxony (born 12 October 1997, in Madrid), known by his Spanish civilian name Boris de Sajonia-Coburgo-Gotha y Ungría, is the elder son of Miriam Ungría y López and Kardam, Prince of Tarnovo, and the grandson of former Tsar Simeon II of Bulgaria.

He is, after the death of his father on 7 April 2015, first in line of succession to the defunct Bulgarian throne.

Boris, who has maintained close relations with the Spanish royal family since his father's death, speaks Spanish, English, French and some Bulgarian.<ref name=larazon>La Razón. Carmen Duerto. 28 April 2015. Boris de Bulgaria asume su destino. (Spanish). Retrieved 8 May 2017.</ref>  He is an artist, devoted to sculpture, plays the guitar and was educated at the Lycée Français Molière in Villanueva de la Cañada in the vicinity of Madrid.  He completed his baccalaureate studies in Austria.

 Honours and awards 

 Dynastic 

 House of Saxe-Coburg-Gotha-Koháry: Knight Grand Cross with Collar of the Order of St Alexander

Titles
Since the dissolution of the Bulgarian Monarchy in 1946, these titles are no longer recognized by the Bulgarian government: 
 12 October 1997 – 7 April 2015: His Royal Highness Prince Boris of Bulgaria, Duke in Saxony
 7 April 2015 – present: His Royal Highness'' The Prince of Tarnovo

Ancestry

References

1997 births
Living people
House of Saxe-Coburg and Gotha (Bulgaria)
People from Madrid